The individual dressage at the 2013 European Dressage Championship in Herning, Denmark was held at MCH Arena from 21 to 25 August.

Great Britain's Charlotte Dujardin won the gold medal in both Grand Prix Special and Grand Prix Freestyle. Helen Langehanenberg representing Germany won a silver medal in both Grand Prix Freestyle and Grand Prix Special. Adelinde Cornelissen of Netherlands won a bronze in special and in the Freestyle as well. In the Grand Prix Germany won the golden team medal, while the Netherlands won the silver medal and Great Britain bronze.

Competition format

The team and individual dressage competitions used the same results. Dressage had three phases. The first phase was the Grand Prix. Top 30 individuals advanced to the second phase, the Grand Prix Special where the first individual medals were awarded. The last set of medals at the 2013 European Dressage Championships was awarded after the third phase, the Grand Prix Freestyle where top 15 combinations competed, with a maximum of the three best riders per country.

Judges
The following judges were appointed to officiate during the European Dressage Championships.

  Leif Törnblad (Ground Jury President)
  Susan Hoevenaars (Ground Jury Member)
  Francis Verbeek- van Rooy (Ground Jury Member)
  Andrew Ralph Gardner (Ground Jury Member)
  Isabelle Judet (Ground Jury Member)
  Dietrich Plewa (Ground Jury Member)
  Gustaf Svalling (Ground Jury Member)
  Gotthilf Riexinger (Technical Delegate)

Schedule

All times are Central European Summer Time (UTC+2)

Results

References

2013 in equestrian